Electric overhead traveling cranes or EOT cranes are a common type of overhead crane, also called bridge cranes. They consist of parallel runways, much akin to rails of a railroad, with a traveling bridge spanning the gap. EOT cranes are specifically powered by electricity.

Applications 
EOT cranes are extensively used in warehouses and industry. An EOT crane is able to carry heavy objects to anywhere needed on the factory floor, and can also be used for lifting. However, it cannot be used in every industry. The working temperature is to limited to a range between -20℃ to 40℃.

Single girder EOT crane 
A single girder EOT crane has one main girder, making it easy to install, and requires less maintenance. The most common single girder EOT cranes are as follows:
 LD type single girder EOT crane
 LDP type single girder EOT crane and
 HD type single girder EOT crane

It is used for lighter industrial applications as it has lower weight limits.

Double girder EOT crane 
 QD type hook double bridge crane 
 LH electric hoist double girder bridge crane
 NLH type double girder EOT crane

References

Lifting equipment
Cranes (machines)